Monique Tumema Fiso (born October 23, 1987) is a New Zealand-Samoan chef and author known for her contribution to the revival of Māori and Polynesian cuisine.

Early life 
Monique Fiso was born in Wellington, New Zealand and is of Māori and Samoan descent. Chef Monique Fiso made a name for herself in New York, working in Michelin-star restaurants. With her trademark determination she decided to make a shift and came home to discover a new style of cooking, and a new side to herself. She appeared on Netflix's The Final Table.

She is the second of 5 children. Her brother is NZ Crossfit Athlete - 6 times NZ Fittest Man Luke Fiso, and her cousin Maaka Fiso is a radio host and competed on X-Factor NZ. She also comes from a long line of entrepreneurs which she credits to her strong work ethic. Her parents Siuai and Serena Fiso run a number of businesses and her uncle is well-known investor John Fiso.

Career 
She attended Wellington Institute of Technology where she gained a City & Guilds Diploma in Cookery and Patisserie and graduated first in her class. While completing her culinary studies she worked under notable New Zealand Chef, Martin Bosley. She then moved to New York City to further expand her culinary knowledge and experience as a chef. During her time in New York, she worked for notable Michelin starred chefs Brad Farmerie, Missy Robbins and Matt Lambert.

In 2016, she returned to New Zealand and founded Hiakai, a pop up dining series devoted to the exploration and development of Māori cooking techniques and ingredients. In 2017, the New Zealand Innovation Council awarded Hiakai the top award for "Innovation in Māori Development" and finalist for "Start up Innovation of the Year" and "Supreme New Zealand Innovation of the Year". She has appeared on multiple New Zealand television and radio shows including Radio Live, Maori Television, and Sunday TVNZ.

She released a book about Māori cuisine also called Hiakai: Modern Māori Cuisine in 2020 which won the Booksellers Aotearoa New Zealand Award for Illustrated Nonfiction at the 2021 Ockham New Zealand Book Awards.

References

External links
 Monique Fiso's Capital Kai on RNZ Nine to Noon, 1 August 2019.
 Monique Fiso - taking kai global on RNZ Afternoons with Jesse Mulligan, 20 November 2018.
 Monique Fiso talks Māori Kai on RNZ Afternoons with Jesse Mulligan, 1 July 2016
 

1987 births
Living people
New Zealand chefs
Women chefs
People from Wellington City
New Zealand people of Samoan descent
New Zealand Māori people